Kabwe Kasongo (born 31 July 1970) is a Congolese retired footballer who played as a left back.

During his extensive career, spent mainly in Portugal, he is best known for his lengthy spell at Chaves, both as player and manager.

Club career
Born in Kinshasa, Kasongo played in his country for Lubumbashi Sport and Daring Club Motema Pembe. In 1996, he moved to Portugal where he was to spend 12 years as a player, starting at S.C. Covilhã in the Liga de Honra then signing with Vitória de Guimarães from the Primeira Liga in the following season, being relatively used during over two years.

Kasongo joined G.D. Chaves in the 1999 summer, and played there until his retirement, collecting almost 300 official appearances and competing exclusively in the second tier apart from 2007–08, which was his last year. He retired at the age of 38, but remained with his main club as its assistant manager and helped it return to the second level for the 2009–10 campaign.

International career
Kasongo made his debut for the Zaire national team in 1992, and played for them during a full decade. He represented his country at the 2000 Africa Cup of Nations held in Ghana and Nigeria, at which the country reached the group stage, conceding only once in three matches but failing to score.

External links

1970 births
Living people
Footballers from Kinshasa
Democratic Republic of the Congo footballers
Association football defenders
Daring Club Motema Pembe players
Primeira Liga players
Liga Portugal 2 players
Segunda Divisão players
S.C. Covilhã players
Vitória S.C. players
G.D. Chaves players
Democratic Republic of the Congo international footballers
1992 African Cup of Nations players
1994 African Cup of Nations players
1996 African Cup of Nations players
2000 African Cup of Nations players
Democratic Republic of the Congo expatriate footballers
Expatriate footballers in Portugal
Democratic Republic of the Congo expatriate sportspeople in Portugal
21st-century Democratic Republic of the Congo people